Valentín Campa is a future station of the Mexico City Metro in the borough of Álvaro Obregón, Mexico City. It will be an underground station with two side platforms, served by Line 12 (the Golden Line), between Álvaro Obregón and Mixcoac stations. It will serve the colonias of Carola and Francisco Villa.

The station will be named after Valentín Campa, a railway union leader. The expansion of Line 12 was approved in March 2013 and started in April 2016, and the station is expected to open in December 2023. The station was formerly known as Benvenuto Cellini. Like the rest of the line, Valentín Campa station will be accessible.

References

Mexico City Metro Line 12 stations
Railway stations scheduled to open in 2023
Mexico City Metro stations in Álvaro Obregón, Mexico City
Accessible Mexico City Metro stations